109 may refer to:

 109 (number), the integer following 108 and preceding 110
 AD 109, a year of the Julian calendar, in the second century AD
 109 BC, a year of the pre-Julian Roman calendar
 109 (department store), a department store in Shibuya, Tokyo, Japan
 109 (MBTA bus), a bus route in Boston, Massachusetts, USA
 Messerschmitt Bf 109, a German World War II fighter plane
 109, a anti-semitic dogwhistle referring to the number of countries the Jews have been expelled from.

See also
 10/9 (disambiguation)
Meitnerium, synthetic chemical element with atomic number 109